Nathaniel Sheraldton Allen (born May 13, 1948) is a former American football cornerback who played nine seasons in the National Football League (NFL).

He played college football at Texas Southern.

References

External links
NFL.com player page

1948 births
Living people
People from Georgetown, South Carolina
American football cornerbacks
Texas Southern Tigers football players
Kansas City Chiefs players
San Francisco 49ers players
Minnesota Vikings players
Detroit Lions players